António Martins (4 April 1892 – 3 October 1930) was a Portuguese sports shooter. He competed at the 1920 Summer Olympics and 1924 Summer Olympics. He also competed in the discus throw at the 1924 Summer Olympics. His son of the same name also represented Portugal at the Olympics as a sports shooter.

References

External links
 

1892 births
1930 deaths
People from Abrantes
Portuguese male sport shooters
Portuguese male discus throwers
Olympic shooters of Portugal
Olympic athletes of Portugal
Shooters at the 1920 Summer Olympics
Shooters at the 1924 Summer Olympics
Athletes (track and field) at the 1924 Summer Olympics
Sportspeople from Santarém District